John Leonard Buren (10 June 1913 – 4 May 1991) was an American politician.

John Buren was born in Leland, Iowa, on 10 June 1913, to parents William Pascal and Mary Elizabeth Buren. He attended the public schools in his hometown, then studied at Columbia College for two years. During World War II, Buren served a two-year stint in the United States Navy. Outside of politics, Buren worked variously as an insurance agent, livestock farmer, and ran car dealerships, as well as a grocery store.

Buren's political experience at the local level included six years each on the Leland school board and city council, and another six years as chair of the Winnebago County Democratic Party. In the 1964 Iowa Senate election, he won the 47th district seat. Two years later, Buren won reelection, after redistricting to the 43rd district.

Buren married Thora M. Berg in 1933, with whom he raised a daughter and a son. He died on 4 May 1991.

References

1991 deaths
1913 births
20th-century American politicians
Democratic Party Iowa state senators
Loras College alumni
People from Winnebago County, Iowa
School board members in Iowa
Iowa city council members
American grocers
American businesspeople in insurance
United States Navy personnel of World War II
Businesspeople from Iowa
Farmers from Iowa
Military personnel from Iowa
American automobile salespeople